Nahala means either "heritage" / "inheritance", or "homestead" / "estate". Also spelled nachala and nahalah. When followed by a connected term, the suffix -t is added, thus becoming nahalat (as a feminine noun in the construct form), with the common variant spellings nachlat and nahlat.

It may refer to:

Places in Israel
 Nahala, Israel, a moshav in south-central Israel
 Nahalat Binyamin, a street and neighbourhood in Tel Aviv, Israel
 Nahalat Reuben, the old name of Ness Ziona
 Nahalat Shimon, a neighborhood in Jerusalem
 Nahalat Shiv'a, a neighborhood in Jerusalem
 Nahalat Yitzhak, a neighborhood of Tel Aviv
 Nahalat Yitzhak Cemetery, Givatayim, east of Nahalat Yitzhak neighborhood
 Nachlaot, a grouping of 23 courtyard neighborhoods in central Jerusalem

Other uses
 nahala or yahrtzeit, a Jewish annual memorial observance of somebody's day of death

See also
 Nahla (disambiguation), Arabic common noun and derived name and toponym
 Nahalal, moshav in northern Israel